Heid Ingrid Alma Meldahl (born 20 February 1952; also known as Ingrid Thidevall-Meldahl) is a Swedish female curler.

In 1988 she was inducted into the Swedish Curling Hall of Fame.

Teams

Women's

Mixed doubles

References

External links
 
 
 

Living people
1952 births
Swedish female curlers
Swedish curling champions